Lee Chung-hee may refer to:

 Lee Chung-hee (basketball)
 Lee Chung-hee (swimmer)

See also
 Lee Jung-hee (disambiguation)